Ahmad S. Dallal is a scholar of Islamic studies and an academic administrator. He is the current president of The American University in Cairo.

Biography 
Dallal received his bachelor's degree in engineering from the American University of Beirut. He worked in the aviation industry before earning his master's and doctorate from Columbia University.

Dallal taught at Stanford University, Yale University, and Smith College before joining the Georgetown University faculty, where he was an associate professor of Arabic and Islamic studies and Chair of Georgetown's Arabic and Islamic Studies department. His research focused on the history of learning and the history of sciences in Islamic societies as well as Islamic thoughts and movements. He delivered the Dwight H. Terry Lectureship at Yale University in 2008, titled Islam, Science, and the Challenge of History.

Dallal served as the provost of the American University of Beirut from 2009 to 2015 before returning to teach history at the university. He was named dean of Georgetown University in Qatar in 2017.

In 2021, Dallal was named 13th President of The American University in Cairo. He is the first Arab to serve as president of the university.

References 

Living people
American university and college faculty deans
Presidents of universities in Egypt
Academic staff of the American University of Beirut
Georgetown University faculty
Columbia Graduate School of Arts and Sciences alumni
American University of Beirut alumni
Historians of Islam
Arab academics
Arab scholars
Year of birth missing (living people)
Deans of Georgetown University in Qatar